Dubai Festival City Mall is a shopping mall in Dubai Festival City, on Dubai Creek in Dubai, United Arab Emirates (UAE). It was originally opened in 2007, but expanded in 2017.

The mall includes IKEA (the first in the UAE), Carrefour (formerly a HyperPanda supermarket, the first hypermarket outside Saudi Arabia), Ace Hardware, and the Robinsons Department Store from Singapore, opened in March 2017.

The mall fronts onto a former marina, now called Festival Bay and used for regular nighttime "IMAGINE" sound and light fountain displays. There is an Abra boat service across Dubai Creek between the Dubai Festival City Mall and the Al Jaddaf Marine Station, close to the Dubai Creek metro station on the green Line of the Dubai Metro. This is operated by the Dubai Roads and Transport Authority (RTA). 

Attached to the mall are a InterContinental hotel (the InterContinental Dubai Festival City), a Crowne Plaza hotel, and a Holiday Inn hotel. The mall is close to Dubai International Airport. On the opposite bank of the Dubai Creek is the Mohammed Bin Rashid Library. The Khalifa Tower can be seen in the distance.

See also
List of shopping malls in Dubai

References

External links

 Dubai Festival City Mall website

2007 establishments in the United Arab Emirates
Shopping malls established in 2007
Shopping malls in Dubai